Evgeny Korolev was the defending champion. He didn't take part in these championships this year.
Benjamin Becker defeated 6–4, 6–4 Karol Beck in the final.

Seeds

Draw

Finals

Top half

Bottom half

External links
 Main Draw
 Qualifying Draw

Intersport Heilbronn Open - Singles
2009 Singles